The Begleitpanzer 57 (Escort Tank 57) AIFSV (Armored Infantry Fire Support Vehicle) was a project of the companies Thyssen-Henschel and Bofors. Only a single prototype was built. It consists of a modified Marder chassis carrying a Bofors 57 mm Naval Automatic Gun L/70 Mark 1 and a TOW ATGM.

In the mid-1970s, the two then-existing companies Thyssen-Henschel and Bofors began without government mandate the development of an infantry escort tank, to fill the niche of a light fire support platform. The vehicle was first introduced in November 1977. However, due to lack of interest from potential buyers, the project was not pursued.

Description 
The modified hull of the armored personnel carrier Marder was used as chassis. Here all the components of the infantry fight, such as bullet covers, rear MG, tailgate and hatchways of the crew compartment had been removed to accommodate the much larger turret and associated equipment.

The asymmetrically shaped turret resembles the Marder turret. On the left of the turret ceiling is the hatch of the commander with angle mirrors and a stabilized round periscope. On the right side of the turret is the gunner's hatch, with access to the exterior TOW launcher. The launcher operated with a telescope with night vision thermal imaging system, a laser rangefinder and tracked control system for the missiles. For the commander, there was a monitor with parallel information.

The turret had a recess in the middle in the longitudinal direction, in which the external, crest-fixed pipe cradle was mounted, holding the Bofors 57 mm Naval Automatic Gun L/70 Mk 1. The cannon had an autoloader and moved in the elevation range from -8° to +45°. The vehicle carried an ammunition supply of 48 cartridges 57 mm ammunition and six anti-tank guided missiles.

The technical data corresponded to those of the Marder, except
the length with cannon in 12 o'clock position: 7.48 m;
the height: 2,51 m.

In game industry 
Begleitpanzer 57 appears in the MMO game Armored Warfare as a Tier V Light Tank.
Begleitpanzer 57 appears in the MMO game War Thunder as a vehicle in the German tank tree in tier VI.

Literature 
F.M. von Senger und Etterlin: Taschenbuch der Panzer 1983 – Tanks of the World. Bernard & Graefe, München 1983, .
F.M. von Senger und Etterlin: Tanks of the World 1983. Arms and Armour Press, London 1983,  (engl.)

Experimental and prototype tanks
Assault guns